Thitawee Aksornsri (born 8 November 1997) is a Thai professional footballer who plays as a centre back, he has also been used as a right back for Thai League 1 club Port.

International career
In January 2020, Thitawee played the 2020 AFC U-23 Championship with Thailand U23.

Personal life
Thitawee's twin older brother Thitathorn, who is also a footballer and plays as a left back. His older brother, Tatpicha Aksornsri, is also a footballer and plays as a goalkeeper.

References

External links

Thitawee Aksornsri at Soccerway

1997 births
Living people
Thitawee Aksornsri
Thitawee Aksornsri
Association football defenders
Thitawee Aksornsri
Thitawee Aksornsri
Thitawee Aksornsri
Thitawee Aksornsri
Twin sportspeople